Neu-Falkenstein Castle is a castle in the municipality of Balsthal of the Canton of Solothurn in Switzerland.  It is a Swiss heritage site of national significance.

Image gallery

See also
 List of castles in Switzerland

References

Cultural property of national significance in the canton of Solothurn
Castles in the canton of Solothurn